Antonio Marmorino (born 25 January 1973) is an Italian sprint canoer who competed in the mid-1990s. At the 1996 Summer Olympics in Atlanta, he was eliminated in the semifinals of the C-2 500 m event.

References
Sports-Reference.com profile

1973 births
Canoeists at the 1996 Summer Olympics
Italian male canoeists
Living people
Olympic canoeists of Italy
Place of birth missing (living people)
20th-century Italian people